Current Diabetes Reports is a monthly peer-reviewed medical journal that publishes review articles on all aspects of diabetes. It was established in 2001 and is published by Springer Science+Business Media. The editor-in-chief is Jose C. Florez (Massachusetts General Hospital). According to the Journal Citation Reports, the journal has a 2017 impact factor of 3.568.

References

External links

Endocrinology journals
Review journals
Springer Science+Business Media academic journals
Monthly journals
Publications established in 2001
English-language journals